Chiridopsis bipunctata, commonly known as Indian green tortoise beetle or sweetpotato tortoise beetle, is a species of leaf beetle found in India, Thailand and Sri Lanka.

Gallery

References 

Cassidinae
Insects of Sri Lanka
Beetles described in 1798